Reza Fallah (1909–1982) was an Iranian businessman and political advisor. He shaped the Iranian oil policy under Shah Mohammad Reza Pahlavi.

Early life
Reza Fallah was born on 15 September 1909 in Kashan, Iran. He graduated from high school in Tehran. He studied Petroleum Engineering at the University of Birmingham in England on a British Petroleum scholarship, receiving a PhD.

Career
In 1939, he returned to Iran and worked in the private sector. He then taught and served as Dean of the Abadan Technical Institute.

In the 1950s and 1960s, he served as general manager the Abadan Refinery, formerly owned by the Anglo-Iranian Oil Company. He served as deputy chairman of the National Iranian Oil Company from 1974 to 1979. During that time, he advised Shah Mohammad Reza Pahlavi and essentially shaped Iran's oil policy. He was also a co-founder of the Organization of Petroleum Exporting Countries (OPEC).

During the Iranian revolution of 1979, he accompanied the Shah into exile. He refused to return to Iran, despite being summoned by Prime Minister Mehdi Bazargan. Indeed, he was on Ayatollah Khomeini's death list.

Personal life
He was married to Maheen Fallah (1919–2000). They had three daughters: Lilly Fallah Lawrence and Gina "Kooky" Fallah. A third daughter died in a car accident when they were living in Tehran.

Death
He died on 5 December 1982 in Windsor, near London, England. He is buried in Brookwood Cemetery.

References

1909 births
1982 deaths
People from Kashan
Iranian emigrants to the United Kingdom
Alumni of the University of Birmingham
20th-century Iranian businesspeople
National Iranian Oil Company people
OPEC people
Burials at Brookwood Cemetery
Iranian political consultants